Andrei Bogdanovich Semak (born 9 December 1974) is a former Russian-Ukrainian professional football player.

Club career
He played in the Russian Football National League for FC Kuban Krasnodar in 1998.

Personal life
His younger brothers Sergei Semak and Nikolai Semak also were footballers.

References

1974 births
Ukrainian emigrants to Russia
Living people
Russian footballers
Association football defenders
FC Khimik Severodonetsk players
FC Hirnyk Rovenky players
FC Kuban Krasnodar players
FC Slavyansk Slavyansk-na-Kubani players
Ukrainian First League players